"Pelados em Santos" is a song written by Alecsander Alves (best known by the nickname Dinho), and performed by the Brazilian comedy rock band Mamonas Assassinas. The song was released in 1995, in their only album Mamonas Assassinas. The song enjoyed fame in Brazil and other countries in Latin America. It was a EMI release.

Cover versions

The Brazilian rock group Titãs covered this song in 1999, in their cover album As Dez Mais.

Music video
The music video of the song shows each member of the band offering a wide range of fictional products of the brand "Titãs" (like banks, whiskeys, food, etc.) in a Bombril commercials-like studio (actually, the PV was introduced by the same man that made the Bombril TV commercials), with alternate shots of naked women holding the As Dez Mais CD.

In the middle of the video, a brand of giant cigarettes ("Titãs lights") is introduced by the Bombril man, and a warning on the upper left edge says: "Os Titãs advertem: O Ministério faz mal à sua saúde" (Titãs warn: the Ministry is unhealthy for you), a parody of the similar warning placed in all cigarettes' packs in Brazil, as well on cigarette advertisings in television: "O Ministério da Saúde adverte: fumar é prejudicial à saúde" (The Ministry of Health warns: smoking is unhealthy'').

Other shots include Tony Bellotto pretending sex with a sex doll, some band members hugged with the naked women and the final shot of the clip, with all the band members and the Bombril man singing the song.

According to the band, the idea of inviting Washington Olivetto was "to play with our fame of being a commercial band. We thought of singing as if we were doing a commercial for the song, which is the reason for a music video exist".

References 

1999 singles
Titãs songs
1996 singles
1995 songs
EMI Records singles